"Big Enough" is a single by Christian singer Ayiesha Woods from her 2006 album Introducing Ayiesha Woods. It was released to Christian radio stations around late 2006. The song features American Christian hip hop recording artist TobyMac. The song became the Wood's first Hot Christian Songs Top 10, peaking at No. 10.  It lasted 20 weeks on the overall chart. The song is played in a D major key at 140 beats per minute.

Charts

Weekly charts

Year-end charts

References

2006 singles
Contemporary Christian songs
2006 songs
Songs written by Christopher Stevens (musician)